The Canon PowerShot G9 X is a digital compacted camera announced by Canon Inc. on October 13 2015. The G9 X replaces the older Canon PowerShot S120 compact camera. With a reduced zoom range and larger sensor, the camera was the smallest and lightest compact camera since the Canon PowerShot G7 X.

In January 2017 Canon announced the upcoming release of the PowerShot G9 X Mark II.

References
http://www.dpreview.com/products/canon/compacts/canon_g9x/specifications
http://www.popphoto.com/ces-2017-canon-announces-powershot-g9-x-mark-ii-advanced-compact-camera

G9 X
Canon PowerShot G9 X